Chih-Kang Shih (aka Ken Shih) is a physicist, currently the Dr. Arnold Romberg Endowed Chair and Jane and Roland Blumberg Professor at University of Texas at Austin.

Education 
In 1988, Shih earned a PhD from Stanford University.

Career 
In 1982, Shih's technical career began as a research assistant at Stanford Electronics Lab at Stanford University.

Shih is a Professor of Physics at University of Texas at Austin.

References

External links 
 

Year of birth missing (living people)
Living people
21st-century American physicists
21st-century Taiwanese physicists
National Tsing Hua University alumni
University of Oregon alumni
Stanford University alumni
University of Texas at Austin faculty
Fellows of the American Physical Society